SWI/SNF-related matrix-associated actin-dependent regulator of chromatin subfamily E member 1-related is a protein that in humans is encoded by the HMG20B gene.

Interactions 

HMG20B has been shown to interact with:
 BRCA2,
 HDAC1,
 HDAC2,
 KIF4A, 
 PHF21A, and
 RCOR1.

References

Further reading

External links